The Portland Rising is a professional ultimate team based in Portland, Maine which competes in the Premier Ultimate League (PUL). It plays at Fitzpatrick Stadium. Their stated mission is to "dream big and work in partnership with our community to RISE together."

Franchise history 
Portland Rising formed for the 2020 season as part of an 4 team expansion to the PUL. The team is owned by Chloë Rowse and is the first professional sports team to feature women, non-binary, trans, and genderfluid athletes in Maine. The team held tryouts with over 100 attendees in January 2020 and announced its roster for the inaugural season in March 2020.

The team would have played its first season in 2020 (as part of PUL's second season of play), but the PUL cancelled the season due to the COVID-19 pandemic. Of the cancellation, Rowse stated, "Regardless of what happens here in Portland and around the world over the next weeks and months, Rising is already so much more than this season’s schedule. The Rising community and Rising energy that has been created over the past three months aren’t going anywhere."

in August of 2021 Rising hosted one of the three regional competitions that made up the 2021 PUL Championship Series, which served as an abbreviated competition season in response to the ongoing COVID-19 pandemic. Rising was defeated by the Austin Torch and Medellin Revolution to finish 3rd in the International competition.

During the 2022 regular reason Rising complied an impressive 5-1 record, finishing second in the East Division.  Multiple milestones were achieved for the franchise, including the first victory, as well as the first home win.

Schedule 
2022 Regular season schedule.

Record

Current staff 

 Coach - Ryan Cardinal (he/him)
 Coach - Eva Fury (they/them)
Coach - Ethan Fortin (he/him)

GM - Mohdis Baker (she/her)

Roster 
The team's 2022 roster is as follows:

References

External links 
Official website: https://www.portlandrising.me/

Premier Ultimate League teams
Ultimate (sport) teams
Ultimate teams established in 2020
2020 establishments in Maine
Sports in Portland, Maine